Vahid Jalilvand (Persian: وحید جلیلوند; born March 11, 1976) is an Iranian film director, screenwriter, actor and editor. He has won the Crystal Simorgh for Best First Director and Best First Film at the 33rd Fajr Film Festival and the FIPRESCI Award at the 72nd Venice International Film Festival for his feature directorial debut in drama film Wednesday, May 9 (2015). In 2017, he won The Orizzonti Award for Best Director at the 74th Venice International Film Festival for his second film, No Date, No Signature. His third film, Beyond the Wall (2022) competed for the Golden Lion at the 79th Venice International Film Festival.

Career 
Vahid Jalilvand was born in Kermanshah in 1976. He is a graduate of University of Tehran in theatre directing. Jalilvand started his career as a theatre actor and made his stage debut when he was only 15. In 1996, he started working in the Iranian State TV channels as an editor and then as a TV director. Later, he directed two home video series and more than 30 documentaries in social and industrial fields. He has been the director and actor in many television series and plays. “Wednesday, May 9”, his first feature was awarded FIPRESCI Prize and the INTERFILM Award for Promoting Inter-religious Dialogue in Orizzonti, Venice Int’l Film Festival 2015. “No Date, No Signature” is his second feature which was awarded best director and best actor in Orizzonti, Venice Int’l Film Festival  2017.“No Date, No Signature” was Iran’s representative to the 91st Academy Awards for Best Foreign Language Film, 2019.

Filmography

Feature films

Documentary

Television

Awards and nominations

Wednesday, May/9 

 FIPRESCI Best Film Award, Venice International Film Festival, Italy
 INTERFILM Award, Venice International Film Festival, Italy
 Golden Puffin Award for Best Film, Reykjavík International Film Festival, Island
 Best First Film Director Award, Bratislava International Film Festival, Slovakia
FIPRESCI Best Film Award, Bratislava International Film Festival, Slovakia
 Jury’s Award, Vesoul International Film Festival of Asian Cinema, France
 NETPACK Award, Vesoul International Film Festival of Asian Cinema, France
 Best Fiction Film Award, Berkshire International Film Festival, England
 Crystal Simorgh for Best First Film Director, 33rd Fajr Film Festival, Iran
 Best Direction Award, City Film Festival, Iran
 Best First Film Director Award, Feast of Iran's Cinema Critics and Writers Association, Iran

No Date, No Signature 

 Best Direction Award, in orizzonti, 74th Venice Film Festival
 Gold Hugo Award for Best Direction, 53rd Chicago International Film Festival, USA
 Silver Alexander Award, 58th Thessaloniki International Film Festival, Greece
 Critics Award, 58th Thessaloniki International Film Festival, Greecev
 Critics Award, 19th Bratislava International Film Festival, Slovakia
 Best Screenplay Award, 19th Stockholm International Film Festival, Sweden
 Best Direction Award, Sheed Film Festival, USA
 Jury’s Award for Direction, Belgrade International Film Festival, Serbia
 Best Direction Award, Tarkovsky Film Festival, Russia
 Best Film Award (Grand Prix), Brussels International Film Festival (BRIFF), Belgium
 Crystal Simorgh for Best Direction, 35th Fajr Film Festival, Iran
 Best Direction Award, 20th House of Cinema Feast, Iran
 Best Screenplay Award, 20th House of Cinema Feast, Iran
 Best Scriptwriter Award, 1st Cinema Cinema Academy, Iran
 Best Film Special Award, 1st Cinema Cinema Academy, Iran
 Jury’s Special Award Kinenova Skopje Film Festival, Macedonia
 Best Dramatic Feature Award, Thailand Film Festival

References
https://cinemawithoutborders.com/no-date-no-signature-oscar/

http://ankarasinemadernegi.org/en/directors/vahid-jalilvand/

https://www.youtube.com/watch?v=gba7F_pZiA4

https://www.rogerebert.com/reviews/no-date-no-signature-2018

https://variety.com/2017/film/reviews/no-date-no-signature-review-1202545871/

External links 

http://www.sourehcinema.com/People/People.aspx?Id=138806070200

1976 births
Living people
People from Tehran
Iranian screenwriters
Iranian film directors
Iranian male film actors
Iranian male stage actors
Mass media people from Tehran
Iranian male television actors
Iranian radio and television presenters
Crystal Simorgh for Best Director winners